Futura Trentino is a left-wing political party active in Trentino.

History
Futura was founded in 2018 by the journalist Paolo Ghezzi as Futura 2018. the list took part in the 2018 provincial elections of Trento, in the centre-left coalition in support of Giorgio Tonini, and won 6.9% of the votes and two seats.

In 2019 the assembly of the party's members elected Piergiorgio Cattani as the new president of Futura, in place of the resigning Ghezzi. Later, in 2020, Ghezzi also left his seat in the Provincial Council of Trento.

In 2021, following the death of Cattani, the municipal councilor of Trento Nicola Serra was appointed as the new president of the party.

Leadership
President: Paolo Ghezzi (2018-2019); Piergiorgio Cattani (2019–2021); Nicola Serra (2021–present)

References

External links
Official website

Political parties in Trentino
Political parties established in 2018